"Diary" is a song written and produced by David Gates and released by his band Bread in 1972, both as a single and on the album Baby I'm-a Want You.

It spent 11 weeks on the Billboard Hot 100 chart, peaking at No. 15, while reaching No. 3 on Billboards Easy Listening chart, No. 12 on Canada's RPM 100, and No. 26 on Australia's Go-Set chart.  The song was ranked No. 50 on Billboards year-end ranking of 1972's "Top Easy Listening Singles".

Anita Kerr recorded an easy listening cover of "Diary", which featured Pieter van Vollenhoven on piano, and was released on her 1979 album Together, which reached No. 42 in the Netherlands.

Chart performance

References

1972 songs
1972 singles
Bread (band) songs
Songs written by David Gates
Elektra Records singles